Namazonurus campbelli, commonly known as Campbell's girdled lizard, is a species of lizard in the family Cordylidae. A small girdled lizard, N. campbelli is endemic to Namibia.  It is often mistaken for the more common Herero girdled lizard, N. pustulatus, as they both are similar in size and have flattened bodies. N. campbelli lives in rock crevices and cracks on dry mountain slopes

Etymology
The generic name, Namazonurus, contains "zonurus " meaning "girdle-tailed".

The specific name, campbelli, is in honor of William A. Campbell (1880–1962), the owner of the Farm "Barby" where the type specimen was discovered.

Description
N. campbelli has a spiky appearance. The caudal scales are strongly keeled and spinose, and the spines are longest on the flanks. The head is a darker brown colour and the back is a chestnut to light brown, covered with smallish yellow spots with patchy dark-brown crossbars that sometimes bear a dark band to the centre. The belly is off-white.

N. campbelli can be differentiated from N. namaquensis which has a well-marked dark streak on the side of the head and two narrow streaks along the sides of the body (absent in N. campbelli ), and no pale spots down the middle of the back (present in N. campbelli ).

Reproduction
N. campbelli is ovoviviparous.

Geographic range
It is only known from Lovedale, Barby, and Kunjas Farms. The distribution area is approximately 6,746 km² (2,605 sq mi).

Habitat

See also
Cordylus

References

Further reading
Branch, Bill (2004). Field Guide to Snakes and other Reptiles of Southern Africa.  Third Revised edition, Second impression. Sanibel Island, Florida: Ralph Curtis Books. 399 pp. . (Cordylus campbelli, p. 186 + Plate 104).
Stanley, Edward L.; Bauer, Aaron M.; Jackman, Todd R.; Branch, William R.; Mouton, P. Le Fras N. (2011). "Between a rock and a hard polytomy: Rapid radiation in the rupicolous girdled lizards (Squamata: Cordylidae)". Molecular Phylogenetics and Evolution 58 (1): 53-70. (Namazonurus campbelli, new combination).

Namazonurus
Reptiles of Namibia
Endemic fauna of Namibia
Reptiles described in 1938
Taxa named by Vivian Frederick Maynard FitzSimons